Fragments of War is a 1988 Australian TV movie about the war photographer Damien Parer.

References

External links

Fragments of War at Screen Australia

Australian drama television films
Biographical films about war photographers
Films produced by Doug Mitchell
1980s English-language films
1988 films
1988 television films
Australian biographical drama films
1980s Australian films